S. costata may refer to:

Schefflera costata, a flowering plant species
Scissurella costata, a sea snail species
Scopula costata, a moth species
Sepaicutea costata, a beetle species
Spilarctia costata, a moth species
Symplocos costata, a flowering plant species

Synonyms
Styela costata, a synonym of Styela angularis, a tunicate species